Jean-François Marmontel (11 July 1723 – 31 December 1799) was a French historian, writer and a member of the Encyclopédistes movement.

Biography 

He was born of poor parents at Bort, Limousin (today in Corrèze). After studying with the Jesuits at Mauriac, Cantal, he taught in their colleges at Clermont-Ferrand and Toulouse; and in 1745, acting on the advice of Voltaire, he set out for Paris to try for literary success. 

From 1748 to 1753 he wrote a succession of tragedies: Denys le Tyran (1748); Aristomene (1749); Cleopâtre (1750); Heraclides (1752); Egyptus (1753). These literary works, though only moderately successful on the stage, secured Marmontel's introduction into literary and fashionable circles.

He wrote a series of articles for the Encyclopédie evincing considerable critical power and insight, which in their collected form, under the title Eléments de Littérature, still rank among the French classics. He also wrote several comic operas, the two best of which probably are Sylvain (1770) and Zémire et Azore (1771). In the Gluck–Piccinni controversy he was an eager partisan of Piccinni with whom he collaborated in Roland (Piccinni) (1778) and Atys (1779), both using Jean Baptiste Lully's libretto by Quinault as basis, Didon (1783) and Penelope (1785).

In 1758 he gained the patronage of Madame de Pompadour, who obtained for him a place as a civil servant, and the management of the official journal Le Mercure, in which he had already begun the famous series of Contes moraux. The merit of these tales lies partly in the delicate finish of the style, but mainly in the graphic and charming pictures of French society under King Louis XV. The author was elected to the Académie française in 1763. In 1767 he published Bélisaire, now remarkable in part because of a chapter on religious toleration which incurred the censure of the Sorbonne and the archbishop of Paris. Marmontel retorted in Les Incas, ou la destruction de l'empire du Perou (1777) by tracing the cruelties in Spanish America to the religious fanaticism of the invaders.

He was appointed historiographer of France (1771), secretary to the Academy (1783), and professor of history in the Lycée (1786). As a historiographer, Marmontel wrote a history of the regency (1788). Reduced to poverty by the French Revolution, Marmontel retired during the Reign of Terror to Evreux, and soon afterwards to a cottage at Abloville (near Saint-Aubin-sur-Gaillon) in the département of Eure. There he wrote Memoires d'un père (4 vols., 1804), including a picturesque review of his life, a literary history of two important reigns, a great gallery of portraits extending from the venerable Jean Baptiste Massillon, whom more than half a century previously he had seen at Clermont, to Honoré Mirabeau. The book was nominally written for the instruction of his children. It contains an exquisite picture of his own childhood in the Limousin; its value for the literary historian is great.

Marmontel lived for some time under the roof of Madame Geoffrin, and was present at her famous dinners given to artists; he was welcomed into most of the houses where the encyclopaedists met, and was a contributor to the Encyclopédie ou Dictionnaire raisonné des sciences, des arts et des métiers. He thus had at his command the best material for his portraits, and made good use of his opportunities. After a short stay in Paris when elected in 1797 to the Conseil des Anciens, he died at Abloville.

He was a member of the Masonic lodge Les Neuf Sœurs.

John Ruskin named him as one of the three people in history who were the most influential for him. In his autobiography, John Stuart Mill credits Memoires d'un père with curing him of depression.

Works

Theatre 
Marmontel published many opera librettos and mostly operas comiques librettos, a genre in which he excelled but could not compete with Charles-Simon Favart. 
1748: Denys le tyran, tragedy, 5 February
1749: Aristomène, tragedy, 30 April
1750: Cléopâtre, tragédie, 20 May
1751: La Guirlande, acte de ballet, music by Jean-Philippe Rameau
1751: Acante et Céphise, pastorale héroïque in three acts, music by Jean-Philippe Rameau
1752: Les Héraclides, tragedy, 24 May
1753: Égyptus, tragedy
1753: Lisis et Délie, pastorale héroïque in 1 act, music by Jean-Philippe Rameau
1753: Les sibarites, acte de ballet, music by Jean-Philippe Rameau
1761: Hercule mourant, tragédie lyrique, music by Antoine Dauvergne
1762: Annette et Lubin 
1766: La Bergère des Alpes
1768: Le Huron, opera comique, music by André Grétry
1769: Lucile, opéra comique, music by André Grétry
1770: Sylvain, opéra comique, music by André Grétry
1771: L'amie de la maison, opéra comique, music by André Grétry
1771: Zémire et Azor, opéra comique, music by André Grétry
1773: Céphale et Procris, ballet héroïque, music by André Grétry
1775: La Fausse magie, opéra comique, music by André Grétry
1783: Didon, opera, music by Niccolò Piccinni
1785: Pénélope, opéra comique, music by Niccolò Piccinni
1788: Démophoon, music by Luigi Cherubini.

Poetry 
 Polymnie, satire en 11 chants
1751: L’établissement de l’École militaire,
1752: Vers sur la convalescence du Dauphin,
1753: La naissance du duc d’Aquitaine, 
1760: Épître aux poètes,
1820: La Neuvaine de Cythère, (licencious poem)

Novels 
1755–1759: Contes moraux, 
1767: Bélisaire,<ref>Ce livre interdit a directement fait l'objet d'une critique Examen du Bélisaire de M. Marmontel</ref> Reprinted in 1787 by the Bibliothèque amusante. (see the two paintings by Jacques Louis David Bélisaire demandant l'aumône)
1777: Les Incas, ou la destruction de l'empire du Perou1792: Nouveaux contes moraux Essays 
1763: Poétique française, 3 parts: a work in which Racine and Boileau are strongly attacked.
1777: Essai sur les révolutions de la musique en France,
1785: De l’Autorité de l’usage sur la langue,
1787: Éléments de littérature. Modern edition at Desjonquères, presented, established and annotated by Sophie Le Ménahèze, 2005.
1788: Mémoire sur la régence du duc d’Orléans1792: Apologie de l’Académie française.

 Varia 
1746:  L'Observateur littéraire : literary journal established with Jean-Grégoire Bauvin (or Beauvin) ; « Cette feuille, écrira-t-il, n'étant ni la critique infidèle et injuste des bons ouvrages, ni la satire amère et mordante des bons auteurs, elle eut peu de débit.» . The title was revived by abbé de La Porte in 1758.
1712–1714: The Rape of the Lock by Alexander Pope, translated into verse La boucle de cheveux enlevée, 1746. Edition bilingue moderne chez Rivages poche, 2010, 142 pages 
1759: édition remaniée de Venceslas by Rotrou,
1766: La Pharsale de Lucain, translated into prose, 
1775: édition des Chefs d’œuvres dramatiques de Mairet, Du Ryer et Rotrou, with a Commentaire,
1800: Mémoires d’un père pour servir à l’instruction de ses enfants, 
1806: Leçons d’un père à ses enfants sur la langue française''.

Notes

References

External links
 
 
 Marmontel on Wikisource

1723 births
1799 deaths
People from Corrèze
18th-century French male writers
18th-century French dramatists and playwrights
18th-century French novelists
18th-century French poets
18th-century French journalists
French opera librettists
French literary critics
18th-century French historians
French fantasy writers
Members of the Académie Française
Les Neuf Sœurs
Contributors to the Encyclopédie (1751–1772)
French historiographers
Prisoners of the Bastille
18th-century French memoirists